St Andrew's Church is a Church of England church in Steart, Somerset, England. The church, which was built in 1882, is now used for services periodically.

History
St Andrew's was erected as a chapel of ease to the parish church of St Mary Magdalene, Stockland Bristol, at the expense of Rev. Henry A. Daniel, vicar of the parish, for £700. The vicar also provided the church with an endowment of over £1,000 under the requirement that at least one Sunday service would be held there each week. The building was designed by Messrs Foster and Wood of Bristol and constructed by Messrs Joseph Willis and Son of Bridgwater. St Andrew's opened on 30 November 1882.

In July 1962, the Bishop of Bath and Wells, Rev. Edward Henderson, dedicated a newly created pathway to the church, which had been formed across land donated by Mr. Stanley Stone of Church Farm. St Andrew's had previously only been accessible by crossing through a field. The dedication, carried out on 13 July, had been requested by Mr. Patrick Daniel, a descendant of Rev. Daniel. It marked the first formal visit by a Bishop of the Diocese to Steart.

The church was damaged by fire in 1986 after the bell turret was struck by lightning. It was subsequently restored, but the turret was not replaced.

Architecture
St Andrew's is built of red brick in the Early English style, with Staffordshire tiles on its roof. It was constructed with double walls, a bordered ceiling and bell turret. The interior is made up of a nave, south porch and vestry. The original seats were made from pitch pine.

References

Churches in Somerset
Church of England church buildings in Somerset